James Crowley (16 October 1879 – 21 January 1946) was an Irish nationalist politician and veterinary surgeon. He was born at William Street in Listowel, County Kerry and was the son of butcher Michael Crowley and Jane O'Connor. He was a member of the Irish Volunteers. He was elected at the 1918 general election as a Sinn Féin MP for the Kerry North constituency. In January 1919, Sinn Féin MPs refused to recognise the Parliament of the United Kingdom and instead assembled at the Mansion House in Dublin as a revolutionary parliament called Dáil Éireann. At the official roll call, Crowley was marked "fé ghlas ag Gallaibh" (imprisoned by the foreign enemy).

During the War of Independence he was interned in the Curragh Camp. He was elected at the 1921 elections as a Sinn Féin Teachta Dála (TD) for Kerry–Limerick West and was released after the truce. He supported the Anglo-Irish Treaty and voted in favour of it. He was re-elected at the 1922 general election as a Pro-Treaty Sinn Féin TD and subsequently as a Cumann na nGaedheal TD at the 1923 general election for the Kerry constituency. He lost his seat at the 1932 general election and retired from politics.

Crowley was married in Tralee in November 1909 to Clementine Boursin and raised a family.

Sources
Todd Andrews (1979), Dublin Made Me.

References

External links

1879 births
1946 deaths
Early Sinn Féin TDs
Cumann na nGaedheal TDs
Politicians from County Kerry
Members of the 1st Dáil
Members of the 2nd Dáil
Members of the 3rd Dáil
Members of the 4th Dáil
Members of the 5th Dáil
Members of the 6th Dáil
Members of the Parliament of the United Kingdom for County Kerry constituencies (1801–1922)
UK MPs 1918–1922
People of the Irish Civil War (Pro-Treaty side)